HMAS Cook (GOR 291/A 219), named after Captain James Cook, was an oceanographic research vessel of the Royal Australian Navy (RAN).

Design work for a dedicated oceanographic research vessel to replace the converted frigate  began in the late 1960s. The ship was ordered in 1973. Displacement was 1,900 tons at standard load, and 2,450 tons at full load. Propulsion machinery consisted of diesel engines, connected to two propeller shafts. Cook was operated by a ship's company of 150, with facilities for up to 13 civilian scientists. The ship's armament was limited to light calibre weapons only.

Cook was laid down by HMA Naval Dockyard at Williamstown, Victoria, on 30 September 1974, launched on 27 August 1977 and commissioned into the RAN on 28 January 1980. After a six-year construction period the ship spent another two years in dockyard hands fixing defects from the building period, including the realignment of the entire propulsion mechanism to reduce vibration.

Cook paid off on 31 October 1990 and was sold for conversion as a small cruise ship and subsequently renamed "Maria Kosmas" - IMO number 8872784. As of 2009, the vessel was in the United Arab Emirates) under the name "Cosmos", in the hands of Platinum Yachts for conversion into a private yacht, but work had been suspended.

Citations

References

Survey ships of the Royal Australian Navy
1977 ships